The 1991–92 La Liga season, the 61st since its establishment, started on August 31, 1991, and finished on June 7, 1992. Barcelona – which also won the European Cup for the first time in their history – finished the season as champions for the second season running.

Team information

Clubs and locations

League table

Relegation playoff

First Leg

Second Leg

Results table

Pichichi Trophy

References

1991 1992
1991–92 in Spanish football leagues
Spain